LTCG may refer to:

 Larry the Cable Guy (born 1963), American stand-up comedian, actor, producer, singer and former radio personality
 Link time code generation, a type of computer code optimization
 Long-term capital gains, a type of capital gains tax
 Trabzon Airport in Trabzon, Turkey (ICAO code)